The 2022–23 Lamar Cardinals basketball team represented Lamar University during the 2022–23 NCAA Division I men's basketball season. The Cardinals were led by second-year head coach Alvin Brooks and played their home games at the Montagne Center in Beaumont, Texas. The Cardinals' returned as members of the Southland Conference following one season in the Western Athletic Conference.  The Cardinals finished the 2022–23 season 9–22 overall and 5–13 in Southland Conference play to finish last in conference. The Cardinals failed to qualify for the SLC tournament.

Previous season
The Cardinals finished the 2021–22 season 2–27, 0–18 in WAC play to finish last in conference. The Cardinals failed to qualify for the  WAC tournament.

Offseason

Incoming transfers

Source:

Recruits

Source:

Preseason polls

Southland Conference Poll
The Southland Conference released its preseason poll on October 25, 2022. Receiving 44 votes overall, the Cardinals were picked to finish ninth in the conference.

Preseason All Conference
No Cardinals were selected as members of a Preseason all conference team.

Roster 
Sources:

Schedule and results

|-
!colspan=12 style=| Exhibition

|-
!colspan=12 style=| Non-conference regular season

|-
!colspan=12 style=| Southland regular season

Source:

See also 
2022–23 Lamar Lady Cardinals basketball team

References

Lamar Cardinals basketball seasons
Lamar
Lamar Cardinals basketball
Lamar Cardinals basketball